The Zionist Journey is a collection of seven bronze sculptures. Initially located in front of the Azrieli Center in Tel Aviv, Israel, in 2015 it was relocated to the Azrieli mall in Haifa. It represents a period Israel's development since the 1920s. It was created by the sculptor Henry Betzalel, initiated by David Azrieli.

Bronzes
The sculpture consists of seven bronze figures, each representing an aspect of Israel (right to left):

 The period of settlement and Aliyah is represented by a First Aliyah halutz.
 Israeli independence is represented by a Palmach fighter.
 The public health sector is represented by a nurse.
 Israeli architecture is represented by an architect, a sculpture of David Azrieli himself.
 Economic development is represented is represented by a businesswoman.
 The evolution of Israeli science and research is represented by a scientist.
 The development of the technology industry is represented by a computer specialist.

The sculpture was inspired by The Burghers of Calais of Auguste Rodin.

See also
Israeli sculpture
Monumental sculpture

References

Further reading
 
 Photograph
 

Year of establishment missing
Bronze sculptures in Israel
Statues in Israel
Sculptures of men
Sculptures of women
Culture in Tel Aviv
Tourist attractions in Tel Aviv
Zionism